The following is a list of active theatres and concert halls in Scotland.  They are organised alphabetically by name.

In rural areas, church halls and town halls may double up as theatres, and that many colleges and universities also have their own auditoria.

A

 Abbey Theatre, Arbroath
 Aberdeen Arts Centre
 AECC, Aberdeen
 Adam Smith Theatre, Kirkcaldy
 Alhambra Theatre Glasgow
 The Alhambra Theatre, Dunfermline
 Aros Centre Isle of Skye
 Arts Guild, Greenock
 Assembly Roxy, Edinburgh

B

 Barrfields Pavilion, Largs
 Beach Ballroom, Aberdeen
 Bedlam, Edinburgh
 Biggar Puppet Theatre
 Birnam Arts, Birnam
 Bowhill Little Theatre, Selkirk
 Britannia Music Hall, Glasgow
 Brunton Theatre, Musselburgh
 Byre, St Andrews

C

 C venues, Edinburgh
 Caird Hall, Dundee
 Capitol, Aberdeen
 Carnegie Hall, Dunfermline
 Catstrand, St John's Town of Dalry
 Centre for Contemporary Arts, Glasgow
 Church Hill Theatre, Edinburgh
 Citizens, Glasgow
 Clyde Auditorium, Glasgow
 Corn Exchange, Cupar
 Corn Exchange, Edinburgh
 Cottiers, Glasgow, Glasgow

D

 Dumbarton People's Theatre, Dumbarton
 Dundee Contemporary Arts, Dundee
 Dundee Repertory Theatre

E

 Eastgate Theatre and Arts Centre, Peebles
 Eastwood Theatre, Giffnock, Glasgow  
 East Kilbride Arts Centre 
 East Kilbride Village Theatre
 Eden Court, Inverness
 Edinburgh Playhouse, Edinburgh; by seating capacity, the largest theatre in the UK

F

 Festival Theatre, Edinburgh
 The Fullarton, Castle Douglas

G
 Gable End Theatre, Hoy
 Gaiety Theatre, Ayr
 Garrison Theatre, Lerwick
 Glasgow City Halls
 Glasgow Rep
 Glasgow Royal Concert Hall
Gordon Aikman Theatre, Edinburgh

H
 Hamilton Townhouse, Hamilton
 Harbour Arts Centre, Irvine
 Heart of Hawick, Hawick
 His Majesty's, Aberdeen
 Howden Park Centre, Livingston
 The Hydro, Glasgow

I
 Isle of Bute Discovery Theatre

K

 King's, Edinburgh
 King's, Glasgow
 King's, Kilmarnock
 Kirkwall Arts Theatre, Kirkwall

L

 An Lanntair, Stornoway
 The Lemon Tree, Aberdeen
 Lochgelly Centre, Lochgelly
 Lochside Theatre, Gatehouse of Fleet

M
 Macrobert, Stirling
 The Mill Thurso
 Mitchell, Glasgow (part of Mitchell Library)
 Mull Little Theatre, Isle of Mull
 Music Hall Aberdeen

O
 Oran Mor, Byres Road, Glasgow
 Orkney Theatre, Kirkwall

P

 Palace, Kilmarnock
 Pavilion, Glasgow
 Perth Concert Hall, Perth
 Perth Theatre, Perth
 Pitlochry Festival Theatre, Pitlochry
 The Pleasance, Edinburgh

Q
 Queen's Hall, Edinburgh

R
 The Ramshorn, Glasgow
 Regal Community Theatre, Bathgate
 Rothes Halls, Glenrothes
 Royal Conservatoire of Scotland, Glasgow
 Royal Lyceum Theatre, Edinburgh
 Rutherglen Town Hall, Glasgow 
 Ryan Leisure Centre, Stranraer

S

 Scottish Dance Theatre, Dundee
 SECC, Glasgow
 The Stand, Edinburgh
 The Stand, Glasgow
 Strathpeffer Pavilion, Strathpeffer

T

 Theatre Royal, Dumfries
 Theatre Royal, Edinburgh
 Theatre Royal, Glasgow
 Tivoli Theatre, Aberdeen
 Tramway, Glasgow
 Traverse Theatre, Edinburgh
 Tron Theatre, Glasgow

U
 Underbelly, Edinburgh
 University Theatre, Edinburgh
 Usher Hall, Edinburgh

W
 The Wynd, Melrose
 Websters Theatre, Glasgow, Glasgow
 Webster Memorial Theatre, Arbroath

See also
 Theatre of Scotland
 Aberdeen theatres and concert halls
 List of Scottish dramatists

References 

!
Scotland
Theatres